Talbert Armand Luster (March 9, 1868 - January 26, 1951) was a Democratic member of the Mississippi House of Representatives, representing Claiborne County, from 1912 to 1920.

Biography 
Talbert Armand Luster was born on March 9, 1868, in Cayuga, Hinds County, Mississippi. He was the son of Miles Jerome Luster and Eliza Ann (Nixon) Luster. He was a member of the planter class. He graduated from the Iuka Normal Institute with a B. S. in 1892. He married Mary Rebecca Williams in 1893, and she died in 1903, leaving 2 children. He married Charlie Douglas McDowell, daughter of Solomon McDowell, in 1907. He died on January 26, 1951, and was buried in the cemetery in Cayuga.

Political career 
Luster was first elected to the Mississippi House of Representatives, representing Claiborne County, in November 1911. He was re-elected in 1915. He was a Democrat.

References 

1868 births
1951 deaths
People from Hinds County, Mississippi
People from Utica, Mississippi
Democratic Party members of the Mississippi House of Representatives